The 1946 Orange Bowl was a college football postseason bowl game between the Miami Hurricanes and the Holy Cross Crusaders

Background
Holy Cross was led by rookie head coach John "Ox" DaGrosa. Jack Harding had returned to the Hurricanes after serving in the war, in Miami's first bowl game since 1935. This was their third 8-win season under Harding, the first two in 1938 and 1941.

Game summary
Joe Krull gave Miami the lead on his 1-yard run for a touchdown, but the kick failed, leaving it at 6–0. Holy Cross' Walter Brennan caught a touchdown pass from Koslowski to counter, but the kick failed, leaving it tied at 6. The Crusaders were driving towards the end zone, tied at 6–6. With less than 15 seconds remaining, Holy Cross was at the Miami 26. Unwilling to settle for the tie, DaGrosa sent in Gene DeFilippo to go for the win. DeFilippo threw a pass for receiver Bob Conway, but the ball fell off his fingertips at the 11-yard line, and Al Hudson retrieved the ball and dashed 89 yards for the touchdown as time expired.

Aftermath
The Crusaders went 9–8 before DaGrosa left the program in 1947. He died in 1953, after a short illness. This remains the only bowl appearance for Holy Cross. Miami returned to the Orange Bowl five years later in 1951. Conway returned to Holy Cross for a 50th Orange Bowl reunion, where he met up with Hudson once again. The two became friends and them and their families have dinner when they vacation in Florida.

Statistics

References

Orange Bowl
Orange Bowl
Holy Cross Crusaders football bowl games
Miami Hurricanes football bowl games
January 1946 sports events in the United States
Orange Bowl